The Hollywood Casino at Penn National Race Course is a thoroughbred horse racing track and casino which is located in Grantville, Pennsylvania,  east of Harrisburg. It is owned by Gaming and Leisure Properties and operated by Penn Entertainment.

This track is also home to Eclipse Special Award winner Rapid Redux and his trainer David J. Wells.

History
The track opened on August 30, 1972. It consists of a  dirt course and a seven-furlong turf course. It is unusual among United States thoroughbred tracks in offering racing fifty-two weeks each year. 

It features the $200,000 Pennsylvania Governor's Cup Handicap for horses three-years-old and up which run five furlongs on the turf. In 2009, Cardashi, ridden by jockey David Cora, won in a 29–1 upset.

In 2013, the inaugural Penn Mile on turf was run. Its first winner was three-year-old Rydilluc, which finished with a time of 1:33.99. As of 2017, this race is now the only Graded stakes race event at the track that is classified as a Grade II race with stakes of $500,000.

Controversies
This racetrack has been under ongoing investigations through the years by the FBI for race fixing, which included people working in the race office, trainers and vets.

Stakes Races
The following Graded events were held at Penn National in 2019.

Grade II

Penn Mile Stakes

Other Stake races

Lyphard Stakes (PA Bred)
Danzig Stakes (PA Bred)
New Start Stakes (PA Bred)
Penn Oaks
Penn Ladies Dash 
Pennsylvania Governor's Cup 
Robellino Stakes (PA Bred)
Fabulous Strike Stakes
Swatara Stakes
Blue Mountain Stakes (PA Bred)

Casino
The Hollywood Casino opened at Penn National on February 12, 2008. On July 13, 2010, table games began operation. As of July 2010, Hollywood Casino has over 2,480 slot machines and fifty-four tables. Table games include: fourteen Poker tables, Black Jack, Roulette, Craps, Pai-Gow Poker, Three and Four Card Poker, Mini-Baccarat, and Let-It-Ride. 

The Pennsylvania Gaming Control Board approved a sports betting license for the Hollywood Casino on October 3, 2018.

On November 15, 2018, sports betting began at the Hollywood Casino with a two-day test; official sports betting began on November 17, 2018. This casino then became the first casino in Pennsylvania to offer sports betting.

On July 15, 2019, the Hollywood Casino conducted a soft launch for online gambling, with the full launch occurring on July 18, 2019 after a testing period. Online gambling offered by Hollywood Casino consists of slot machines and table games, with online poker to launch at a later date.

In the summer of 2020, the Pennsylvania Department of Health and the Pennsylvania Gaming Control Board ruled that smoking was banned in the casino, eensuring smoke-free gaming; however, there are two covered places in front of the casino where smoking is still permitted.

Penn National Gaming also operates other casinos under the Hollywood Casino brand.

See also
List of casinos in Pennsylvania 
List of casinos in the United States 
List of casino hotels

References

External links

Horse racing venues in Pennsylvania
Casinos in Pennsylvania
Grantville, Pennsylvania
Buildings and structures in Dauphin County, Pennsylvania
Sports venues completed in 1972
Casinos completed in 2008
Tourist attractions in Dauphin County, Pennsylvania